The 2016 Football Federation South Australia season was the 110th season of soccer in South Australia, and the fourth under the National Premier Leagues format.

League tables

2016 National Premier Leagues SA

The National Premier League South Australia 2016 season was played over 22 rounds, with the number of teams in the competition reduced to 12 teams.

League Table

Finals

Results

Leading Goalscorers

2016 NPL State League 1

The 2016 NPL State League 1 was the fourth edition of the NPL State League 1, the second level domestic association football competition in South Australia (and third level within Australia overall). 12 teams competed, playing each other twice for a total of 22 rounds.

2016 NPL State League 2

The 2016 NPL State League 2 was the first edition of the new NPL State League 2 as the third level domestic association football competition in South Australia (and fourth level within Australia overall). 9 teams took part, all playing each other twice for a total of 16 matches. New teams included SAASL teams Fulham United and Adelaide Vipers and also Collegiate Soccer League team Mount Barker United.

2016 SA Regional Leagues

2016 Women's NPL

The highest tier domestic football competition in South Australia for women was known for sponsorship reasons as the PS4 Women's National Premier League.   This was the inaugural season of a new NPL format. The 8 teams played a triple round-robin for a total of 21 games.

Finals

Promotion/relegation play-off

Cup competitions

2016 Federation Cup

South Australian soccer clubs competed in 2016 for the Federation Cup. Clubs entered from the NPL SA, the State League 1, State League 2, South Australian Amateur Soccer League and South Australian Collegiate Soccer League. 

This knockout competition was won by North Eastern MetroStars. 

The competition also served as the South Australian Preliminary rounds for the 2016 FFA Cup. In addition to the MetroStars, the A-League club Adelaide United qualified for the final rounds, entering at the Round of 32.

References

2016 in Australian soccer
Football South Australia seasons